Mary Connor may refer to:

Mary Connor (camogie), see All-Ireland Intermediate Camogie Championship
Mary Connor, character in 77 Park Lane

See also
Mary O'Connor (disambiguation)